"Papi" is a song recorded by American singer Jennifer Lopez for her seventh studio album Love? (2011). The Latin-flavored dance song was written by RedOne, AJ Junior, BeatGeek, Teddy Sky, Bilal Hajji and Jimmy Joker, and produced by RedOne, BeatGeak and Jimmy Joker. The lyrical content of the song revolves around Lopez's love to dance for her man. The song was due to be released as a promotional single to help promote the album on April 19, 2011, but the song was unlocked and released on April 17, 2011, through a campaign on Lopez's Facebook page. "Papi" received praise from music critics, stating that it was one of the highlights from Love?

"Papi" received a full commercial release as Love?s third single in September and October 2011. On October 27, 2011 "Papi" became Lopez's 11th number one single on the Billboard Hot Dance Club Songs Chart. A music video was released for the song and it was directed by Paul Hunter, who had previously worked with her for videos including her 2000 hit "Love Don't Cost a Thing". The plot of the video involves Jennifer Lopez eating a mysterious love cookie, and the next morning a mob of men go crazy for her, chasing her all over the city. The song was also used as the opening number of Miss Earth 2011.

Music and lyrics 

"Papi" is a Latin and electro-flavored, up-tempo dance track written by Bilal Hajji, AJ Junior and Teddy Sky, co-written and produced by BeatGeek, RedOne and Jimmy Joker. The melody is driven by "beating" drums and "pounding" synths. According to Rick Florino, from Artistdirect.com, the song also uses elements of "propulsive house" music. The lyrics center around Lopez's love for dancing for her man. Florino described the song's middle-8 breakdown as "a bass thump and seductive Spanish lines [that] pulsate in tandem before one final crescendo of the chorus." On the line "My rock is shinin’ bright / Even if he ain’t by my side / He makes sure that I glow / I make sure everybody knows," J. Lo sings of her man, who is not around the club but whose presence is sparkling on her finger. It was scheduled for release on April 19, 2011 as the third of four promotional singles. "I'm Into You" was subsequently confirmed as the album's second single. The track was released three days early, after a preview was posted on Lopez's "Like for Love?" campaign, whereby the Love?s three promotional singles were released early if enough fans "liked" them through Facebook. The opening portion of the song is used in the dance-breakdown present in the music video for Lopez's second Love? single, "I'm Into You" (2011).

Critical reception
Staff from entertainment website Idolator said "While this track, like 'On the Floor,' doesn't bring anything new to the dance party table, that isn't really a problem. This track is totally club-ready and there's no reason why it shouldn't play just as well as 'On the Floor'." Joe Guerra from The Houston Chronicle agreed calling the song one of Love?s "best moments." Rick Florino, from Artistdirect.com, gave the song a positive review, saying that on the song, "Lopez [is] at her finest". In his review, Florino praised Lopez's voice, noting that it "pulsates with a fresh, fiery, and focused energy" while also commenting that "her unique delivery brandishes traditional Latin flare, [that] captivates listeners hypnotically." He ended by praising the song's memorable chorus and "majestic hook." Monica Herrera wrote favorably for Billboard that: "The pro-monogamy house trend revived by RiRi's "Only Girl," still going strong here. Fun, harmless, & strictly for Jenny's Latina fans." "Pop Crush"'s Amanda Hensel rated it four-and-a-half stars out of five and wrote that: "Papi is spicy hot — just like the Puerto Rican, Bronx-raised herself." [...] "It's a perfect fit for any club packed full of dance-hungry people, and all-in-all, exemplifies what we love about the singer/actress."

BBC Music's Alex McApherson wrote that: "The woman who gave us the supreme millennial house of Waiting for Tonight will know her way around On the Floor and Papi, both apparent distillations of the trashy Miami house aesthetic that dominates pop these days." Entertainment Weekly's Adam Markovitz wrote that the album is "a harmless collection of prefab dance pop with just enough hints of Latin spice to remind listeners of Jenny's from-the-block past (see: the stoop-party-ready Papi) without losing sight of her Bel Air present." IGN Music's Chad Grischow positively wrote that "The album is at its best when the pace is cranked up on the club bangers, with the thrusting synth and beat assault of "Papi" finding Lopez singing about dancing for her man even if he is not right next to her." Digital Spy's Robert Copsey wrote that "Papi', 'Invading my Mind' and 'Hypnotico' are nothing we haven't heard before, but she carries it off with her unrivalled glamour and effortless sophistication."

Chart performance
For the week ending April 27, 2011, "Papi" debuted on the US Billboard Hot 100 at number 99. Ultimately, the single peaked at number 96 and spent three weeks on the chart, becoming her lowest-peaking entry on the Hot 100. "Papi" experienced more success on the US Billboard Pop Songs chart, where it peaked at number 33.

Music video

Background

The music video was shot in August 2011 in Downtown Los Angeles, California. It was directed by Paul Hunter, who previously directed her music videos for "If You Had My Love" (1999) and "Love Don't Cost a Thing" (2001). A portion of the video was shown on September 16, 2011 on Good Morning America. The full video premiered on September 19, 2011 on VEVO. The music video was edited into a 31 second commercial, promoting the Fiat 500, the car in which Lopez is driving in the music video.

Synopsis
The music video begins with the words "Love? Happens". The video continues with Lopez holding her Blackberry Bold 9900 and chatting with her apartment mail attendant Lisa. They talk about Lopez's love interest; she is disappointed because her lover, who is a colonel in the United States Air Force; has not returned from deployment yet. Lisa then hands over the mail and offers her a cookie which she claims will bring her man back to her. Lisa is careful to tell her to take only a small bite owing to the strength of the cookie, but Lopez accidentally takes too big a bite. The following morning the captivating spell of the cookie takes hold and as Lopez leaves her apartment building she attracts the attention of a man who steals a rose to present to her, only to be tackled by another man. As she walks on through the streets of the city she draws the affection of an ever-increasing number of men, including a gardener, a businessman and a motorcyclist, who fight among one another while Lopez walks on oblivious to the chaos behind her. Lopez finally reaches her car (a Fiat 500) but is swarmed by the group of men who chase her with gifts of flowers and a puppy. The mob eventually outmaneuvers and corners Lopez, forcing her from the car. They proceed to dance around her in a complex display of choreography. She tells the men to stop and quickly discovers that she can control how close they get to her by using her body positions. She manages to lead the men in a quick choreographed sequence before the men all lift her from the ground. Her lover then emerges from a bus and rescues her and the crowd quickly dissipates, leaving the pair to drive away in Lopez's car. The video ends with a shocked Lopez trying in vain to explain to her lover the events she endured throughout the day.

Reception
Idolator's Becky Bain perceived that the clip was "clearly a rejected concept" for a "Lopez-starring romantic comedy", while comparing it to her films The Wedding Planner, The Back-Up Plan and Maid in Manhattan. Bain noted that in the music video, Lopez "attempts to do two things with her new video: first, make herself more rateable by a creating comedic, tongue-in-cheek clip. And secondly, show people how extremely desirable she is by having hundreds of men literally fling themselves off buildings and crash through breakaway glass to win her affections." Billboard'''s Jason Lipshut was unsure about the storyline, but praised the "cheeky choreography" as a "charming nod to Lopez's past videos." The Huffington Post'' gave the music video a positive review: "Ms. Lopez has still got it – "Jenny from the Block" breaks into a signature group dance number and kills it!"

Live performances 
Lopez first performed the song at the iHeart Radio Festival on September 24, 2011. She wore a red-fringed mini-dress. Lopez had previously announced the festival herself, which included Lady Gaga, Coldplay, Alicia Keys and Bruno Mars among several others. She stated: "It's going to be this amazing concert ... to launch the new iHeartRadio, where you can kind of customize your own radio stations  So, it's pretty exciting. I'm glad to be doing it." The following month on October 22, she performed the song during her headlining concert at Mohegan Sun to celebrate its 15th anniversary. Lopez performed "Papi" at the 39th American Music Awards on November 20. It was a part of a medley, along with "Until It Beats No More" and "On the Floor", which Pitbull assisted her with. The performance of the song was almost a replica of the video; a Fiat car which she endorsed was included on stage. She was criticized for using the Fiat as part of her performance. The costume she wore, which consisted of a near-nude body suit with glitter covering necessary places, has been said to resemble the outfit Britney Spears wore in the music video for "Toxic" (2004). Additionally, "Papi" was included on the set list for her 2012 Dance Again World Tour.

Track listing 
Digital download
"Papi" — 3:40

Digital download (Remixes)
"Papi" (Rosabel Radio Edit) — 3:26
"Papi" (Mixin Marc & Tony Svedja Radio) — 3:40
"Papi" (R3hab Radio) – 3:37
"Papi" (It's the DJ Kue Radio Mix!) — 3:53
"Papi" (Rosabel Vocal Club Mix) — 7:29
"Papi" (Mixin Marc & Tony Svedja Extended) — 6:33
"Papi" (R3hab Club) — 4:53
"Papi" (It's the DJ Kue Extended Mix!) — 5:34
"Papi" (Rosabel Attitude Dub) — 7:56
"Papi" (Mixin Marc & Tony Svedja Dub) — 6:17
"Papi" (R3hab Instrumental) — 4:53
"Papi" (It's the DJ Kue Instrumental!) — 5:35

Dimitri Vegas & Like Mike Remix

"Papi" (Dimitri Vegas & Like Mike Remix)  — 3:22

Credits and personnel 
Technical
"Papi" was recorded at Cove Studio in New York City and Henson Recording Studios in Los Angeles.

Personnel

Jim Annunziato – vocal recording
BeatGeek – producer, songwriter, instruments & programming
Josh Gudwin – vocal recording, vocal editor
Bilal Hajji – songwriter
Kuk Harrell – vocal producer, vocal recording, background vocals
Jimmy Joker – producer, songwriter
AJ Junior – songwriter

Nadir "RedOne" Khayat – producer, songwriter, vocal editor, vocal arranger, recording engineer, instruments & programming
Jennifer Lopez – lead vocalist
Trevor Muzzy – audio mixer, recording engineer
Chris "TEK" O'Ryan – vocal editor, recording engineer
Jeanette Olsson – background vocals
Geraldo "Teddy Sky" Sandell – songwriter

Charts

Weekly charts

Year-end charts

Certifications

Release history

See also
 List of number-one dance singles of 2011 (U.S.)

References 

Jennifer Lopez songs
2011 singles
Song recordings produced by RedOne
Songs written by RedOne
Songs written by Bilal Hajji
Dance-pop songs
2010 songs
2011 songs
Island Records singles
Music videos directed by Paul Hunter (director)
Song recordings produced by Kuk Harrell
Songs written by Geraldo Sandell
Songs written by AJ Junior
Songs written by Jimmy Thörnfeldt